Serrimargo is a genus of ground beetles in the family Carabidae. There are about nine described species in Serrimargo.

Species
These nine species belong to the genus Serrimargo:
 Serrimargo ater (Laporte, 1835)  (South and Southeast Asia)
 Serrimargo bimaculatus Fedorenko, 2018  (Vietnam)
 Serrimargo grouvellei Bouchard, 1901  (Indonesia and Malaysia)
 Serrimargo guttiger (Schaum, 1860)  (Indomalaya)
 Serrimargo impressifrons Fedorenko, 2018  (Sri Lanka)
 Serrimargo pahangensis Kirschenhofer, 2010  (Malaysia)
 Serrimargo schenklingi (Dupuis, 1912)  (China, Taiwan, and Vietnam)
 Serrimargo verrucifer (Chaudoir, 1869)  (Malaysia)
 Serrimargo vietnamensis Kirschenhofer, 2010  (Vietnam)

References

Lebiinae